District 12 of the Texas Senate is a senatorial district that currently serves portions of Denton and Tarrant counties in the U.S. state of Texas.

The current Senator from District 12 is Tan Parker.

Top 5 biggest cities in district
District 12 has a population of 818,893 with 588,816 that is at voting age from the 2010 census.

District officeholders

Election history

2022

2020

2016

2012

2010

2006

2002

2000

1996

1994

1992

Notes

References

12
Denton County, Texas
Tarrant County, Texas